Aravindh Chithambaram Veerappan (born 11 September 1999) is an Indian chess grandmaster. He won the Indian chess championships twice, in 2018 and 2019.

Personal life
Aravindh was born in Thirunagar in 1999. His father died when he was three and his mother worked as a Life Insurance Corporation agent to support the family. He learned to play chess at the age of seven from his paternal grandfather, who introduced him to the game in an attempt to quell his desires to constantly leave the house and play cricket with other boys.

Chess career
Aravindh won the Indian U19 Chess Championship at the age of 12. He competed in the World U14 Chess Championship in 2012, placing second to Kayden Troff.

This result earned him his first grandmaster norm; at the time he had not achieved any of his international master norms.

He earned his international master title in 2014 and his grandmaster title in 2015.

In February 2018, he participated in the Aeroflot Open. He finished twenty-sixth out of ninety-two, scoring 5/9 (+3–2=4).

References

External links
 
 

1999 births
Living people
Indian chess players
Chess grandmasters
Sportspeople from Madurai